Brad Cornelsen is a former American football coach and player who is currently the offensive coordinator at Sam Houston State University.  He was the former offensive coordinator and quarterbacks coach at Virginia Tech from 2016 to 2021.

Coaching career
After playing quarterback for Division II, Missouri Southern, Brad began his career in coaching as a student assistant for his alma mater in 1999. In 2000 he served as a student assistant again this time for Northeastern State. In the spring of 2001 he worked as a graduate assistant for Northwest Missouri State under College Football Hall of Famer Mel Tjeerdsma. In the fall he went to Oklahoma State in the same capacity and remained there until the end of the 2002 season. In 2003 he became a part of the Redbirds staff where he would stay until 2007. He spent his first four seasons at Illinois State as the wide receivers coach before spending his final season as the quarterbacks coach. In 2008 the Oklahoma native returned to Oklahoma State as a quality control coach. In 2009 he was given the opportunity to be an offensive coordinator for Northeastern State. He remained with the Riverhawks until the end of the 2011 season. In 2012 he joined Justin Fuente's staff in Memphis as the quarterbacks coach, he previously worked with Fuente at Illinois State. In 2015 he was given a promotion and added the title of co-offensive coordinator, where he coached quarterback Paxton Lynch. He was also nominated for the Broyles Award. In 2016 he followed Fuente to Virginia Tech and was named the offensive coordinator and quarterbacks coach. He was let go following the 2021 season.

Brad was hired on January 17, 2023 as the offensive coordinator for the Sam Houston State Bearkats.

References

Missouri Southern Lions football players
Missouri Southern Lions football coaches
Memphis Tigers football coaches
Northwest Missouri State Bearcats football coaches
Sam Houston Bearkats football coaches
Oklahoma State Cowboys football coaches
Virginia Tech Hokies football coaches
American football quarterbacks
Year of birth missing (living people)
Living people